Johari Lal Meena (born 8 May 1940) is a member of the Rajasthan Legislative Assembly from Rajgarh Laxmangarh constituency.

References 

Indian National Congress politicians from Rajasthan
1940 births
Rajasthan MLAs 2018–2023
People from Alwar district
Living people